Petrovice I is a municipality and village in Kutná Hora District in the Central Bohemian Region of the Czech Republic. It has about 300 inhabitants.

The Roman numeral in the name serves to distinguish it from the nearby municipality of the same name, Petrovice II.

Administrative parts
Villages of Hološiny, Michalovice, Senetín and Újezdec are administrative parts of Petrovice I.

References

Villages in Kutná Hora District